Afromelittia aenescens is a moth of the family Sesiidae. It is known from Malawi, Zambia, Kenya and Mozambique.

References

Sesiidae
Moths described in 1896